Northbrook is a suburb of Chicago, located at the northern edge of Cook County, Illinois, United States, on the border of Lake County. Per the 2020 census, the population was 35,222.

When incorporated in 1901, the village was known as Shermerville in honor of Frederick Schermer, who donated the land for its first train station. The village changed its name to Northbrook in 1923 as an effort to improve its public image. The name was chosen because the West Fork of the North Branch of the Chicago River runs through the village.

Glenbrook North High School, founded in 1952 as Glenbrook High School, is located in Northbrook. The village is also home to the Northbrook Park District, the Northbrook Court shopping mall, the Ed Rudolph Velodrome, the Chicago Curling Club, and the Northbrook Public Library.

History
Members of the Potawatomi tribe were the earliest recorded residents of the Northbrook area. After signing the 1833 Treaty of Chicago, the Potawatomi ceded their Illinois lands and moved to a place near Council Bluffs, Iowa. Afterward, Joel Sterling Sherman moved from Connecticut with his family and bought  of land in the northwest quarter of Section 10 for $1.25 per acre; as of 2010, Northbrook's downtown is located on this site. A German immigrant named Frederick Schermer donated a portion of the land he bought from Sherman to be used for the town's first railroad station, which was named after him. By the 1870s, Shermerville (which also took its name from Shermer) was a farming community. In 1901 the community was incorporated as the Village of Shermerville after a close referendum for incorporation. At the time of incorporation, it had 311 residents and 60 houses. In these early years, Shermerville became notorious for rowdy gatherings at its five saloons; by 1921, therefore, residents believed that the name "Shermerville" had a negative reputation and sought to change it. A renaming contest was held, and the name "Northbrook" was submitted by the US postmaster (and then President of the National Rural Letter Carriers' Association) Edward Landwehr. Edward Landwehr was the son of Herman and Anna Helene Landwehr, both German immigrants and early settlers in the community and for whose family Landwehr Road in Northbrook is named. In 1923 "Northbrook", the winning name, was adopted. At the time, Northbrook had 500 residents. Later on, after the end of World War II, Northbrook's population began to rapidly increase. In 1997, President Bill Clinton visited Northbrook to congratulate the 8th-grade students of Northfield Township (which is mainly Northbrook) for getting the highest score on a world science test, and for getting the second-highest score on a world math test.
Between 1950 and 1980, the town's population rose from 3,319 to 30,735. Northbrook was the first community not bordering Lake Michigan to filter Lake Michigan water for public use. Owing to the suburbanization of the community, the last working farm in Northbrook, the Wayside Farm, was sold and closed in 1987.

Geography
Northbrook is located at  (42.129226, −87.840715).

Northbrook is generally considered to be a part of the Chicago North Shore.

Demographics
As of the 2020 census there were 35,222 people, 12,749 households, and 9,347 families residing in the village. The racial makeup of the village was 77.53% White, 0.76% African American, 0.07% Native American, 16.35% Asian, 0.01% Pacific Islander, 0.80% from other races, and 4.49% from two or more races. Hispanic or Latino of any race were 3.41% of the population.

There were 12,749 households, out of which 53.66% had children under the age of 18 living with them, 66.61% were married couples living together, 5.79% had a female householder with no husband present, and 26.68% were non-families. 24.98% of all households were made up of individuals, and 17.31% had someone living alone who was 65 years of age or older. The average household size was 3.06 and the average family size was 2.55.

The village's age distribution consisted of 20.8% under the age of 18, 5.5% from 18 to 24, 17.5% from 25 to 44, 30.5% from 45 to 64, and 25.6% who were 65 years of age or older. The median age was 49.7 years. For every 100 females, there were 90.0 males. For every 100 females age 18 and over, there were 93.0 males.

The median income for a household in the village was $128,883, and the median income for a family was $173,545. Males had a median income of $105,262 versus $53,061 for females. The per capita income for the village was $72,969. About 1.7% of families and 3.3% of the population were below the poverty line, including 2.7% of those under age 18 and 4.3% of those age 65 or over.

Note: the US Census treats Hispanic/Latino as an ethnic category. This table excludes Latinos from the racial categories and assigns them to a separate category. Hispanics/Latinos can be of any race.

Religion

The North Shore is known for having a significant Jewish population; Northbrook and its neighbors are home to many synagogues and the local high school offers Hebrew language courses. Northbrook has eight synagogues, is home to a K-8 Jewish Day School, Sager Solomon Schecter  Day School of Meperpolitin Chicago and a branch of JCC Chicago.

Besides Judaism, Protestantism and Catholicism are major religions in Northbrook. Northbrook has many churches, including the St. Nortbert Catholic Church, the Village Presbyterian Church of Northbrook, the Northbrook United Methodist Church, the St. Giles Episcopal Church, and the Northbrook Covenant Evangelical Church. There is also a small Orthodox Jewish community.

The Islamic Cultural Center of Greater Chicago is located in Northbrook. The Hindu Hanuman Temple of Greater Chicago is located in neighboring Glenview, and there is a Bahá'í House of Worship in nearby Wilmette.

Society of the Divine Word constructed Northbrook's Techny Towers in 1901 to house their North American headquarters and St. Joseph's Technical School, which operated for twelve years. Techny's name is derived from this school. St. Mary's Mission Seminary, the first of its kind which prepared priests and brothers for foreign missions, was opened by the Divine Word Missionaries in 1909.

Economy
Northbrook had 15,613 employed civilians as of the 2006–2008 census estimate, including 6,841 females. Of the civilian workers, 12,458 were private for profit wage and salary workers.

The corporate headquarters of Underwriters Laboratories, Crate & Barrel, and Bell Flavors & Fragrances are located in Northbrook, as are the North American headquarters of Astellas, a Japanese pharmaceutical company, and Italian-based Barilla, the largest pasta company in the world.

Allstate's headquarters are in a nearby area in Northfield Township. In 2021, the company announced it would sell the property.

Top employers
According to Northbrook's 2018 Comprehensive Annual Financial Report, the top employers in the village are:

Arts and culture
Founded in 1973, the Northbrook Historical Society works to preserve Northbrook's heritage and educate people about it. It operates a museum located in the former Northfield Inn.

Founded in 1980, the Northbrook Symphony is a nonprofit that plays orchestral music in the town.

Just outside of Northbrook lie the Kohl Children's Museum in Glenview and the Chicago Botanic Garden in Glencoe.

Annual cultural events
Northbrook's largest event is Northbrook Days, a multi-day festival typically held every year towards the end of the summer. It features carnival games, roller coasters and amusement rides, food vendors, live music, and raffles. Another prominent event is the Farmers' Market held every Wednesday from June to October in the Meadow Shopping Plaza parking lot on the corner of Cherry Lane & Meadow Street in downtown Northbrook. There, vendors sell locally-made goods such as produce, cheese, pies, and condiments.

Parks and recreation

Northbrook has many parks and golf courses. Parks in Northbrook include Village Green Park, Techny Prairie Park and Fields, Wood Oaks Green Park, Stonegate Park, Crestwood Park, and Greenfield Park. Golf courses in Northbrook include Heritage Oaks Golf Club (formerly Sportsman's Country Club), Anetsberger Golf Course, and Willow Hill Golf Course. Other facilities in the town include the Techny Prairie Activity Center, Northbrook Sports Center, Northbrook Leisure Center, and Meadowhill Aquatic Center.

In recognition of the village's vast greenspace, the Arbor Day Foundation has designated Northbrook as a Tree City U.S.A. community since 1994.

The Northbrook Park District, headquartered in Northbrook, operates recreational facilities in Northbrook. The  park district, formed in June 1927, serves all of Northbrook and some unincorporated areas within Cook County. The park district lies within the townships of Northfield and Wheeling.

Situated along the Des Plaines River Trail upon the Des Plaines River, the River Trail Nature Center houses educational exhibits and events about local biology and wildlife.

Law and government

The Village of Northbrook adopted a council-manager form of government after a 1953 referendum. The Village President, six-member Board of Trustees, and the Village Clerk, all of whom must be residents of Northbrook, are elected at large for staggered four year terms. The board establishes policies and hires a village manager to operate the day-to-day business. The most recent board election took place in 2021, with Kathryn Ciesla winning 4,263 votes (63.31% of the total vote). The current board consists of:

The Northbrook Police Department provides law enforcement and the Northbrook Fire Department provides fire suppression and emergency medical services for the village and its residents. Civil and criminal law cases are heard in the Cook County Circuit Court of the State of Illinois court system, or in the Northern District of Illinois in the federal system. In the state court, the public prosecutor is the Illinois state's attorney; in the Federal court it is the United States attorney.

Politics
Like other suburbs in the area, Northbrook is considered a Democratic stronghold. In the 2008 presidential election, Barack Obama received over 60% of Northfield Township's vote.

At the national level, Northbrook is represented by Senators Dick Durbin and Tammy Duckworth, both Democrats. The northern and western parts of the village are part of Illinois's 10th congressional district, which is currently represented by Brad Schneider, a Democrat from Deerfield. The southern and eastern parts of the village are part of Illinois's 9th congressional district, which is currently represented by Jan Schakowsky, a Democrat from Evanston.

At the state level, Northbrook is a part of the 9th Senate District represented by Laura Fine (D-Glenview), the 29th Senate District represented by Julie Morrison (D-Deerfield), and the 30th Senate District represented by Adriane Johnson (D-Buffalo Grove). Additionally, the village lies within the 17th House District represented by Jennifer Gong-Gershowitz (D-Glenview), the 18th House District represented by Robyn Gabel (D-Chicago), the 57th House District represented by Jonathan Carroll (D-Northbrook), who has an office in Northbrook, the 58th House District represented by Bob Morgan (D-Deerfield), and the 59th House District represented by Daniel Didech (D-Buffalo Grove). At the county level, the municipality lies within District 14 represented by Scott R. Britton (D-Glenview).

Crime
The North Shore is known for its low crime rates. In fact, Northbrook was ranked by MoneyGeek, a financial planning website, as being the safest town in Illinois, largely due to its low ($116 per capita) expenditure on crime. Northbrook's crime rate is significantly lower than the national average. That being said, thefts in Northbrook are not uncommon and have made headlines. Moreover, a murderer who acted in Northbrook is on the  U.S. Marshals ‘15 Most Wanted Fugitives list.

Education

Schools

Public schools

Northbrook is served by multiple school districts. The elementary school districts Northbrook School District 27, Northbrook School District 28, Northbrook/Glenview School District 30, and West Northfield School District 31 serve and are headquartered in Northbrook. Wheeling Community Consolidated School District 21, headquartered in Wheeling, also serves sections of Northbrook.

District 27 operates three grade-level centers in Northbrook, including Hickory Point Elementary School (K-2), Shabonee Elementary School (3–5), and Wood Oaks Junior High School (6-8). David Kroeze is the Superintendent. In the past, the district also contained the Grove School (closed in 2011) and Indian Ridge School (closed in 1984), which is now home to the Leisure Center and Indian Ridge Park.

District 28 operates three (K-5) elementary schools, Meadowbrook Elementary School, Greenbriar Elementary School, and Westmoor Elementary School. Northbrook Junior High School (6-8) is the district's middle school. Formerly operated by District 28, Oaklane School opened in 1957 and closed in 1977.

District 30 operates Wescott Elementary School (K-5) in Northbrook and Willowbrook Elementary School (K-5) in Glenview, with both schools serving Northbrook. Maple Junior High School (6-8) in Northbrook is District 30's middle school.

The portion of Northbrook encompassed by District 31 is served by Winkelman Elementary School in Glenview and Field Junior High School in Northbrook.

Areas within CCSD 21 are served by two schools, Walt Whitman Elementary School in Wheeling and Holmes Junior High School in Wheeling.

Northfield Township High School District 225 is the high school district serving Northbrook. Glenbrook North High School is located in and serves most of Northbrook while Glenbrook South High School, Glenbrook North's main rival, serves nearby Glenview but includes some parts of Northbrook. The western area within Wheeling Community Consolidated School District 21 is served by Township High School District 214 as part of Wheeling High School.

Private schools
 St. Norbert Catholic School, a K-8 Catholic Grade School, is in Northbrook.
 The Cove School, a K–12 school for disabled children, is in Northbrook.
 Solomon Schechter, a K-8 Jewish school, is in Northbrook.
 Countryside Montessori School, a K-8 private school, is in Northbrook.

Colleges

Oakton Community College (in Skokie, Des Plaines and other locations) serves Northbrook and surrounding areas. Northwestern University is located in nearby Evanston, and Lake Forest College is located in nearby Lake Forest.

Public library

Northbrook Public Library is the public library of Northbrook. The library's origins stem from a reading room created by the Citizens' Club of Shermerville. A primary advocate for a library in Northbrook after World War II was Carolyn A. Landwehr, daughter-in-law of Edward Landwehr who had originally suggested the name "Northbrook" for the community. The Northbrook Public Library first opened on June 30, 1952, in space located in the village hall; the first dedicated library building was dedicated in 1954. The northern portion of the current library opened in 1969, and bonds of 1975 and 1997 expanded the current library.

Media

Television
Northbrook's government has a television station that all residents are able to access, NCTV Cable Channel 17. The station broadcasts meetings and information about the village.

Newspapers
Northbrook is served by two newspapers, the Northbrook Star and the Northbrook Herald. The Northbrook Star is a division of the Chicago Tribune, whilst Northbrook Herald is a division of Daily Herald, which is headquartered in Arlington Heights. In the past, the village also housed The Northbrook Tower, a division of 22nd Century Media, which went bankrupt in 2020.

Movies and filming
Director John Hughes, a native of Northbrook, used the fictional town of "Shermer" as a setting for several of his films. David Kamp of Vanity Fair said "Hughes's Shermer was partly Northbrook and partly a composite of all the North Shore's towns and neighborhoods—and, by extension, all the different milieus that existed in American suburbia" and that Shermer "was at once an Everytown for every teen and an explicit homage to Hughes's home turf, the North Shore suburbs above Chicago." Hughes and his family moved to Northbrook in 1962, and Hughes attended Glenbrook North High School.

Some exterior shots of Glenbrook North High School were used in the films The Breakfast Club and Ferris Bueller's Day Off. Northbrook is notable for being home to the "Save Ferris" water tower featured in the movie, which inspired the name of the synonymous band.

Radio
Northbrook is served by WGBK, a non-commercial station operated by students at Glenbrook North High School and Glenbrook South High School. It broadcasts popular music, local high school sports, and covers local news.

Infrastructure

Transportation
Northbrook is connected to Chicago's transportation network.

Roads
Interstate Highways:

  Edens Expressway
  Tri-State Tollway
U.S. Highways:
  Skokie Highway
  Milwaukee Avenue
Illinois State Routes:

  Milwaukee Avenue
  Waukegan Rd
  Dundee Road
Other major roads include:
 Cherry Lane/Church Street
 Lake Cook Road
 Landwehr Road
 Pfingsten Road
 Sanders Road
 Shermer Road
 Skokie Boulevard
 Sunset Ridge Road
 Techny Road
 Walters Avenue
 Willow Road

18 roads in Northbrook are named after pioneer settlers: Bach Street, Dehne Road, Happ Road, Holste Road, Huehl Road, Kiest Avenue, Koehling Road, Landwehr Road, Lee Road, Lorenz Drive, Pfingsten Road, Sanders Road, Sherman Drive, Shermer Road, Voltz Road, Walters Avenue, Wessling Drive, and Winkelman Road.

Public Transit

Northbrook is served by Metra commuter rail. The village is located along the Milwaukee District North Line, which runs from Chicago Union Station to Fox Lake. Northbrook station is located on Shermer Road in downtown Northbrook and Lake Cook Road station is located just across the border in Deerfield. Furthermore, the Amtrak Hiawatha Service and Empire Builder trains stop in nearby Glenview.

Northbrook is also served by Pace suburban bus routes 213, 422, and 471.

For elderly or disabled residents, Northbrook offers paratransit in the form of a subsidized taxi program. Northfield Township, which Northbrook lies in, has an identical program called "Dial-a-Ride".

Airports
Northbrook is located 17 miles away from O'Hare International Airport, 33 miles away from Midway Airport, and next to Chicago Executive Airport. Other major regional airports within driving distance include Milwaukee's General Mitchell International Airport, Chicago Rockford International Airport, and Waukegan National Airport.

From 1929 to 1973 Northbrook was home to Sky Harbor Airport. Today the area it sat on has been transformed into Sky Harbor Business Park, which includes a restaurant and an air conditioning business that operate out of the airport's former hangar.

Utilities
Northbrook's government manages water and sewer services.

Electricity is provided by Commonwealth Edison (ComEd).

Internet can be accessed through Comcast or AT&T.

Natural gas is provided by Nicor Gas.

Garbage and recycling services are handled by Waste Management.

The United States Postal Service operates three post offices in Northbrook: the Northbrook Post Office, the Northbrook Downtown Post Office, and the Techny Post Office.

Health Systems
Several clinics and medical service centers exist in Northbrook including a Lurie Children's Hospital's Outpatient Center. Nearby hospitals include Glenbrook Hospital and Highland Park Hospital, both of which are operated by NorthShore University HealthSystem.

Area codes 
From 1947 until 1988, Northbrook used a single area code, 312. However, in 1988, the 312 area code was made exclusive to Chicago and the 708 area code was introduced. Then, in 1996, the 708 area code was split into three: 708, 630, and 847. Currently, Northbrook uses the 847 area code as well as the 224 area code which was introduced in 2002.

Notable people

David Abidor (born 1992), soccer player
 Scott Adsit (born 1965), comedian, cast member of 30 Rock, voiced Baymax in the Disney film Big Hero 6
 Steve Bartman, namesake of "Bartman incident" from Game 6 of 2003 National League Championship Series
 Steven D. Binder (born 1971), Hollywood producer and screenwriter
 Mike Brown (born 1985), right wing for several National Hockey League teams
 Meg Waite Clayton (born 1959), novelist
 Chris Collins (born 1974), basketball head coach, Northwestern
 J. T. Compher (born 1995), center for NHL's Colorado Avalanche
 Billy Donlon (born 1977), head coach for Wright State Raiders men's basketball 2010-16
 Han Chae-young (born 1980), actress who primarily stars in South Korean television dramas
 Luol Deng (born 1985), small forward for NBA's Chicago Bulls
 Anne Henning (born 1955), Olympic speed skater, 1972 gold medalist
 Dianne Holum (born 1951), Olympic speed skater, 1972 gold medalist
 John Hughes (1950–2009), film director and screenwriter
 Kaskade (born 1971), professional DJ
 Ken Goldstein (born 1969), documentary director; writer; musician, author of "The Way of the Nerd" book series
 Krewella, EDM group
 Jason Kipnis (born 1987), second baseman for MLB's Chicago Cubs
 Jayson Megna (born 1990), right wing for NHL's Vancouver Canucks
 Pat Misch (born 1981), pitcher for MLB's San Francisco Giants, New York Mets
 John Park (born 1988), former American Idol contestant; currently active as a musician in South Korea
 Kathleen Parker (born 1943), Illinois state senator
 Scott Sanderson (1955–2019), pitcher with several MLB teams
 Johnny Seo (born 1995), K-pop artist, member of the K-pop groups NCT 127 and NCT (group)
 Jon Scheyer (born 1987), American-Israeli All-American basketball player for national champion 2009–10 Duke basketball team, also played for Maccabi Tel Aviv

Sister cities
Northbrook became sister cities with Diegem, Belgium, in 1966.

References

External links
 
 Historical society

 
Villages in Illinois
Chicago metropolitan area
Villages in Cook County, Illinois
Populated places established in 1901
Jews and Judaism in Chicago
1901 establishments in Illinois